Árneshreppur is an Icelandic municipality, located in the Westfjords peninsula of northwestern Iceland.

The village Djúpavík at the Reykjarfjörður  is situated in the municipality. Other villages are Gjögur , Norðurfjörður  and Krossnes . The area is served by Gjögur Airport.

References

Municipalities of Iceland
Westfjords